Kahrizak Rural District is in Kahrizak District of Ray County, Tehran province, Iran. At the National Census of 2006, its population was 35,213 in 8,500 households. There were 38,919 inhabitants in 9,666 households at the following census of 2011. At the most recent census of 2016, the population of the rural district was 21,789 in 6,146 households. The largest of its 37 villages was Quch Hesar, with 6,888 people.

References 

Ray County, Iran

Rural Districts of Tehran Province

Populated places in Tehran Province

Populated places in Ray County, Iran